Dorchester County Public Schools is a public school system serving the residents of Dorchester County, Maryland.  There are approximately 5,000 students that attend school in the district.

Board of Education Members 

Superintendent: Mr. W. David Bromwell 
Assistant Superintendent N/A
President: Phil Bramble
Vice-President: Glen Payne
Student Representatives: Kelli Brinsfield

High schools
Cambridge-South Dorchester High School, Cambridge
Dorchester County School of Technology, Cambridge
North Dorchester High School, Hurlock

Middle schools
Mace's Lane Middle School, Cambridge
North Dorchester Middle School, Hurlock

Elementary schools
Choptank Elementary School, Cambridge
Hurlock Elementary School, Hurlock
Maple Elementary School, Cambridge
Sandy Hill Elementary School, Cambridge
South Dorchester School (K-8), Church Creek
Vienna Elementary School, Vienna
Warwick Elementary School, Secretary

Notable teachers
Patrick McLaw

References

External links

School districts in Maryland
Education in Dorchester County, Maryland